Alosa curensis, the Kura shad, is one of the species of clupeid fish endemic to the Caspian Sea basin. It is found in the southwestern part of the brackish sea-lake, near the mouth of the Kura River, Azerbaijan. But generally this is a poorly known species.

References

curensis
Fish of the Caspian Sea
Fish described in 1907